The 1988–89 Louisiana Tech Bulldogs basketball team represented Louisiana Tech University in Ruston, Louisiana as members of the American South Conference during the 1988–89 season. The Bulldogs were led by head coach Tommy Joe Eagles. Louisiana Tech finished second in the American South regular season standings (6–4), but would earn an automatic berth in the NCAA tournament by winning the conference tournament championship. After defeating La Salle in the opening round, the Bulldogs lost to No. 1 seed Oklahoma in the second round.

Roster

Schedule and results

|-
!colspan=9 style=| Regular season

|-
!colspan=9 style=| American South Conference tournament

|-
!colspan=9 style=| NCAA tournament

NBA draft

References

Louisiana Tech Bulldogs basketball seasons
Louisiana Tech
Louisiana Tech
1988 in sports in Louisiana
1989 in sports in Louisiana